
Year 146 BC was a year of the pre-Julian Roman calendar. At the time it was known as the Year of the Consulship of Lentulus and Achaicus (or, less frequently, year 608 Ab urbe condita). The denomination 146 BC for this year has been used since the early medieval period, when the Anno Domini calendar era became the prevalent method in Europe for naming years.

Events 
 By place 
 Roman Republic 
 With Carthage and Greece conquered, Rome becomes the sole superpower in the Mediterranean world, a position it would hold for the next five hundred years.

 Africa 
 Spring – Carthage falls to Roman forces under Scipio Aemilianus and the city is completely destroyed.  End of the Third Punic War.

 Greece 
 Achaean War: The Romans conquer the Achaean League and southern Greece becomes a Roman province.
Battle of Scarpheia: The Romans led by Quintus Caecilius Metellus Macedonicus defeat an Achaean League force under Critolaus
 Battle of Corinth: The Romans under Lucius Mummius defeat the Achaean League near Corinth. Corinth is destroyed, and the Achaean League dissolved.

 By topic 
 Astronomy 
 Hipparchus determines the equinoctial point.

Births

Deaths 
 Critolaus, general of the Achaean League
 Gentius, the last king of Illyria (approximate date)

References